This is a list of Copa Sudamericana winning football managers.  Argentine manager Rubén Darío Insúa led San Lorenzo to success in the inaugural Copa Sudamericana final in 2002. Argentine clubs have been the most successful in the tournament, winning it nine times.

No manager has won the tournament more than once. Argentine managers have led the winning team ten times.

By year

Notes

By nationality
This table lists the total number of titles won by managers of each nationality.

References

External links
Copa Sudamericana official history

Managers